Fourth cabinet of Per Albin Hansson was the cabinet of Sweden between July 31, 1945 and October 6, 1946. It consisted of 16 ministers who were all members of the Social Democratic Party, with party chairman Per Albin Hansson as Prime Minister. The cabinet succeeded the national coalition government (the Third cabinet of Per Albin Hansson), which had ruled during World War II. The cabinet was dissolved as a consequence of the death of the Prime Minister on the date October 6, 1946.

Ministers

References

Sources
Lindorm, Erik. Ett folk på marsch 1932-1946 p. 293

Cabinets of Sweden
1945 establishments in Sweden
1946 disestablishments in Sweden
Cabinets established in 1945
Cabinets disestablished in 1946